Maicon Festa Santana (born 22 February 1989) is a Brazilian footballer who currently plays as a forward for Próspera.

Career statistics

Club

Notes

References

External links

1989 births
Living people
Brazilian footballers
Brazilian expatriate footballers
Association football forwards
Campeonato Brasileiro Série C players
Veranópolis Esporte Clube Recreativo e Cultural players
Sport Club Internacional players
Esporte Clube Santo André players
Clube Esportivo Aimoré players
Juventus Atlético Clube players
Sociedade Esportiva e Recreativa Caxias do Sul players
Iraty Sport Club players
Londrina Esporte Clube players
Esporte Clube Passo Fundo players
Cerâmica Atlético Clube players
Futebol Clube Santa Cruz players
Guarany Futebol Clube players
Grêmio Esportivo Bagé players
Grêmio Esportivo Juventus players
Hong Kong Premier League players
Yuen Long FC players
Brazilian expatriate sportspeople in Hong Kong
Expatriate footballers in Hong Kong